The 2006 Birmingham City Council election took place on 4 May 2006 to elect members of Birmingham City Council in West Midlands, England. One third of the council was up for election, with an extra vacancy in Kingstanding due to pending legal proceedings. The result for Kingstanding was the subject of an election petition after errors at the count led to Sharon Ebanks (BNP) being wrongly declared elected.

Election result
The results saw the council remain in no overall control, with the Conservatives winning the most seats in this election, leading to the Conservatives and Labour holding an equal number of seats on the council.

Ward results

Acocks Green

Aston

Bartley Green

Billesley

Bordesley Green

Bournville

Brandwood

Edgbaston

Erdington

Hall Green

Handsworth Wood

Harborne

Hodge Hill

Kings Norton

Kingstanding

Ladywood

Longbridge

Lozells and East Handsworth

Moseley and Kings Heath

Nechells

Northfield

Oscott

Perry Barr

Quinton

Selly Oak

Shard End

Sheldon

Soho

South Yardley

Sparkbrook

Springfield

Stechford and Yardley North

Stockland Green

Sutton Four Oaks

Sutton New Hall

Sutton Trinity

Sutton Vesey

Tyburn

Washwood Heath

Weoley

References

Birmingham City Council elections
Birmingham
2000s in Birmingham, West Midlands